YZ Reticuli, also known as Nova Reticuli 2020 was a naked eye nova in the constellation Reticulum discovered on July 15, 2020. Previously it was known as a VY Sculptoris type object with the designation MGAB-V207.

VY Sculptoris type
The variability of the object was first discovered by an amateur astronomer, Gabriel Murawski, and reported on August 6, 2019 with the name MGAB-V207. Archive photometry data from the Catalina Real-time Transient Survey and ASAS-SN showed nova-like (NL) brightness variations between magnitudes 15.8 and 17.0, exhibiting a deep dimming event in late 2006. The spectrum shows a hot subdwarf (sdB) or a white dwarf origin, which is consistent with VY Scl type objects.

Nova eruption

On July 15, 2020 Robert H. McNaught discovered a bright transient (magnitude 5.3) coincident with the position of MGAB-V207 and it was spectroscopically confirmed by the Southern African Large Telescope (SALT) as a classical nova on July 16. The spectrum includes Balmer, O and FeII emission lines with P Cygni profiles. Spectrum analysis from observations by the Advanced Technology Telescope revealed a similarity to Nova Sagittarii 1991, three days after maximum brightness. Pre-discovery images showed that the brightness peak happened on July 9, 2020 at magnitude 3.7. In the days after the discovery, the nova faded by 0.2-0.3 magnitudes per day. This is the third case when an already known cataclysmic variable has undergone a classical nova eruption, following V407 Cygni and V392 Persei.

The orbital period of YZ Reticuli is 0.1324539 days (3 hours, 10 minutes, and 44 seconds), but in the months following the eruption, the lightcurve also oscillated with periods of 0.1384 and 0.1339 days. These are likely related to the accretion disk and represent a similar phenomenon to superhumps.

See also
 List of novae in the Milky Way galaxy

References

External links
VY Sculptoris type discovery details, July 15, 2020
Nova Reticuli 2020 bursts into the southern skies - Astronomy.com, July 17, 2020
Bright Nova Reticuli 2020 - blog by Ernesto Guido, July 17, 2020

Reticulum (constellation)

Astronomical objects discovered in 2020
Novae
J03582954-5446411
Discoveries by Robert H. McNaught
Reticuli, YZ